WBLV (90.3 FM) and WBLU-FM (88.9 FM), collectively known as "Blue Lake Public Radio", are two public radio stations in the Grand Rapids / Muskegon area of Michigan, United States, owned by the Blue Lake Fine Arts Camp.

Sources 
Michiguide.com - WBLV history
Michiguide.com - WBLU-FM history

References

External links

BLV
Classical music radio stations in the United States
NPR member stations
Radio stations established in 1979
1979 establishments in Michigan